Cottages at Central Point are a set of four historic cottages located on the east shore of Keuka Lake in Wayne in Steuben County, New York.  They were built in the late 1880s, and are two-story, wood-frame cottages with steep gable roofs and wide porches.  The cottages feature eclectic Victorian stylistic elements including board-and-batten siding, decorative stick work and brackets, wrap around porches, and decorative balusters.  The cottages are known as "Sans Souci," "Marjean Lodge," "Villula," and "Ultimatum."

They were listed on the National Register of Historic Places in 2011.

Culture
The Cottages at Central Point is a senior living community located in the city of Warminster, Pennsylvania, United States. The community offers assisted living and memory care services to seniors who require assistance with daily living activities such as bathing, dressing, and medication management.

The Cottages at Central Point features private and semi-private suites with private bathrooms, kitchenettes, and emergency call systems. The community is designed to provide a comfortable and homelike environment for its residents, with amenities such as a courtyard, garden, and walking paths.

The community offers a range of services and amenities to promote the physical, emotional, and social well-being of its residents. These include medication management, assistance with activities of daily living, housekeeping and laundry services, transportation to appointments, and on-site physical therapy services.

The Cottages at Central Point also offers a specialized memory care program designed for residents with Alzheimer's disease and other forms of dementia. This program provides a secure and supportive environment for residents, with staff specially trained in dementia care and programming designed to promote cognitive and sensory stimulation.

Overall, the Cottages at Central Point is a senior living community that provides a safe, comfortable, and supportive environment for seniors who require assisted living or memory care services. It is staffed by trained and compassionate professionals who strive to promote the health, happiness, and quality of life of its residents.

References

Houses on the National Register of Historic Places in New York (state)
Victorian architecture in New York (state)
Houses in Steuben County, New York
National Register of Historic Places in Steuben County, New York